The 2010 Conference USA baseball tournament was the 2010 postseason college baseball championship of the NCAA Division I Conference USA, held at Cougar Field in Houston, Texas, from May 26–May 30, 2010.  Southern Miss won the tournament and received Conference USA's automatic bid to the 2010 NCAA Division I baseball tournament.

The tournament format changed from that which had been used since the 2000 tournament.  It consisted of six teams split into two three-team pods.  Each team played a total of three preliminary games, two against its podmates and one against a team from the opposite pod.  The team with the best record in each pod going advanced to a single-game final.

Regular season results

SMU, Tulsa, and UTEP do not field baseball teams. Tulane, UAB, and UCF did not make the tournament.

Bracket

Results

Finish order

† - Winner of the tournament and received an automatic bid to the NCAA tournament.
# - Received an at-large bid to the NCAA tournament.

All-Tournament Team

(*)Denotes Unanimous Selection

References

External links
 2010 C-USA Baseball Championship

Tournament
Conference USA Baseball Tournament
Conference USA baseball tournament
Conference USA baseball tournament
Conference USA baseball tournament
Baseball competitions in Houston
College sports tournaments in Texas